JNC may refer to:

 JNC Corporation, formerly Chisso, a Japanese chemical company
 Japan Nuclear Cycle Development Institute, a constituent of the Japan Atomic Energy Agency
 Jewish National Council, an institution in Mandatory Palestine
 Joventut Nacionalista de Catalunya, a political youth organisation in Catalonia
 Judicial nominating commission, a selection body for judges in some U.S. states
 JnC, a South Korean boy group including Jang Su-won